Mudgeeraba is an electoral district of the Legislative Assembly in the Australian state of Queensland. Based on the Gold Coast, the district has been held by both sides of politics over the course of its short history.

The electorate covers the western suburbs and hinterland of the Gold Coast. It was created out of the southern half of the former district of Nerang by the 2001 redistribution.

Dianne Reilly of the Labor Party, the seat's inaugural member, held the seat for three terms until her defeat at the hands of Ros Bates of the Liberal National Party at the 2009 state election.

Members for Mudgeeraba

Election results

References

External links
 

Mudgeeraba